International Women's Collaboration Brew Day is an annual event that takes place each year on International Women's Day (8 March). The event gathers women brewers around the world who brew the same beer. All proceeds are donated to charity. It was established to raise awareness of women in the brewing industry, especially as beer brewmasters. It also networks women interested in brewing.

History 

The idea for the IWCBD came from Project Venus member, Sophie de Ronde, who reached out to the Pink Boots Society in 2013 to start a "unified brew day." De Ronde wanted the day "to encourage women to brew together." The day was meant to coincide with International Women's Day and would "raise awareness of women in the brewing industry and raise money for local charities and Pink Boots Society." Brewing beer is a male-dominated industry and is "struggling with sexism and gender bias." Another participant said, "I'd like to normalize the idea that women can and do work in the brewhouse along with other departments in a brewery."

The first year, 2014, over 60 women in five countries brewed a pale ale called Unite. In 2015, 80 women from eleven countries worked together to brew Unite red ale. In South Africa, Apiwe Nxusani-Mawela, helped organize the first IWCBD event in Johannesburg. For 2016, the type of beer brewed was a gose. By 2018, the number of participanting breweries had increased to 126.

References

External links 
 International Women's Collaboration Brew Day 2016 (video)

Annual events
Brewing
March observances
Observances about food and drink
Women's events
Women in brewing